Nicolas "Hakeem" Kashama (born February 22, 1978) is a former professional gridiron football defensive end. He was signed by the Cleveland Browns as an undrafted free agent in 2004. He played college football for the Connecticut Huskies.

Kashama was also a member of the Hamilton Tiger-Cats, Winnipeg Blue Bombers and Calgary Stampeders.

His brothers Alain, Fernand, and Kalonji, as well as his cousin, Tim Biakabutuka all played professional football.

Professional career

Cleveland Browns
Kashama went undrafted in the 2004 NFL Draft and signed with the Cleveland Browns on May 19, 2004. He was released on June 2 before being re-signed on July 6. On July 21, he was released for the second and final time.

Hamilton Tiger-Cats
Kashama signed with the Hamilton Tiger-Cats on August 9, 2004. He played in two games with Hamilton in 2004, with his debut coming on August 19 against the Ottawa Renegades. He suffered a leg injury on Labour Day that forced him to miss the rest of the season. During his two years in Hamilton, Kashama played in ten games and recorded four tackles which were the only ones of his career.

Winnipeg Blue Bombers
Kashama signed with the Winnipeg Blue Bombers. During the Blue Bombers 2006 training camp, he was noted for his hard hits on offensive players. He was released by Winnipeg on June 10, 2006.

Calgary Stampeders
He originally signed with the Calgary Stampeders during the 2007 offseason before being released after training camp. On June 1, 2008, Kashama re-signed with Calgary and was a final cut on June 22, 2008.

Personal
Kashama is the brother of current Stampeders players Alain and Fernand Kashama. His cousin is also ex-National Football League running back Tim Biakabutuka.

References

Living people
1978 births
Sportspeople from Kinshasa
American football defensive ends
Canadian football defensive linemen
UConn Huskies football players
Cleveland Browns players
Hamilton Tiger-Cats players
Winnipeg Blue Bombers players
Calgary Stampeders players
Black Canadian players of American football
Democratic Republic of the Congo emigrants to Canada
American people of Democratic Republic of the Congo descent
Democratic Republic of the Congo players of American football
Democratic Republic of the Congo players of Canadian football
Hakeem
Canadian people of Democratic Republic of the Congo descent